Hold My Beer Vol. 1 is a duet album by Texas Country music singers Randy Rogers and Wade Bowen.

Track listing
"In the Next Life" (Wade Bowen, Randy Rogers) – 3:42
"I Had My Hopes Up High" (Joe Ely) – 4:05
"'Till It Does" (Bowen, Lee Thomas Miller, Chris Stapleton) – 3:36
"Good Luck with That" (Bowen, John Dickson, Rogers) – 3:45
"It's Been a Great Afternoon" (Merle Haggard) – 3:53
"Standards" (Brady Black, Brian Keane, Rogers) – 3:38
"El Dorado" (Bowen, Bruce Robinson) – 5:06
"Hangin' Out in Bars" (Rogers) – 4:09
"Lady Bug" (Sean McConnell, Jason Saenz) – 3:36
"Reasons to Quit" (Haggard) – 3:43

Personnel
Randy Rogers – Lead Vocals, Background Vocals
Wade Bowen – Lead Vocals, Background Vocals
Jay Saldana – Drums
Caleb Jones – Bass guitar
Will Knaak – Electric Guitar, Banjo
Todd Laningham – Electric Guitar, Acoustic Guitar
Geoffrey Hill – Electric Guitar
Brady Black – Fiddle
Riley Osbourn – Keyboards
Micah Vasquez – Bass guitar
Lloyd Maines – Pedal Steel Guitar, Dobro, Acoustic Guitar, Mandolin

Chart performance

References

External links
Official website

2015 albums
Randy Rogers Band albums
Wade Bowen albums
Vocal duet albums